Caffrogobius is a genus of gobies native to the Atlantic and Indian Ocean coasts of southern Africa and from around the Seychelles.

Species
There are currently seven recognized species in this genus:
 Caffrogobius agulhensis (Barnard, 1927) (Agulhas goby)
 Caffrogobius caffer (Günther, 1874)
 Caffrogobius dubius (J. L. B. Smith, 1959)
 Caffrogobius gilchristi (Boulenger, 1898) (Prison goby)
 Caffrogobius natalensis (Günther, 1874) (Baldy)
 Caffrogobius nudiceps (Valenciennes, 1837) (Barehead goby)
 Caffrogobius saldanha (Barnard, 1927) (Commafin goby)

References

Gobiidae